Hutchinson is the largest city and county seat in Reno County, Kansas, United States, and located on the Arkansas River. It has been home to salt mines since 1887, thus its nickname of "Salt City", but locals call it "Hutch". As of the 2020 census, the population of the city was 40,006.

Each year, Hutchinson hosts the Kansas State Fair, and National Junior College Athletic Association (NJCAA) Basketball Tournament. It is the home of the Hutchinson Community College, the Cosmosphere aerospace museum, and Strataca underground salt museum.

History

The city of Hutchinson was founded in 1871, when frontiersman Clinton "C.C." Hutchinson contracted with the Santa Fe Railway to make a town at the railroad's crossing over the Arkansas River. The town actually sprang up about one-half mile north, on the banks of Cow Creek, where a few houses already existed. C.C. Hutchinson later founded the Reno County Bank in 1873, and by 1878 had erected the state's first water-mill at Hutchinson. The community earned the nickname "Temperance City" due to the prohibition of alcohol set by its founder. Hutchinson was incorporated as a third class city in August 1872.

In 1887, the Chicago, Kansas and Nebraska Railway built a main line from Herington through Hutchinson to Pratt. In 1888, this line was extended to Liberal. Later, it was extended to Tucumcari, New Mexico and El Paso, Texas. It foreclosed in 1891 and was taken over by Chicago, Rock Island and Pacific Railway, which shut down in 1980 and reorganized as Oklahoma, Kansas and Texas Railroad, merged in 1988 with Missouri Pacific Railroad, merged in 1997 with Union Pacific Railroad. Most locals still refer to this railroad as the "Rock Island".

Also in 1887, local salt deposits were discovered for the first time, when Ben Blanchard, a land speculator who founded South Hutchinson, drilled for oil in the area. Salt mining would become a major industry in Hutchinson, with the city eventually earning the nickname "Salt City".

Hutchinson had been holding county fairs since 1873. By 1900 many referred to the Hutchinson fair as the Kansas State Fair, even though there was no state supported Kansas State Fair yet. In 1913, after lobbying in the Kansas Legislature, Hutchinson gifted the State of Kansas the land that became the Kansas State Fairgrounds. The official Kansas State Fair has been held in Hutchinson ever since.

In 1943, German and Italian prisoners of World War II were used in Kansas and other Midwest states as a means of solving the labor shortage caused by American men serving in the war effort. Large prisoner-of-war camps were established in Kansas: Camp Concordia, Camp Funston (at Fort Riley), Camp Phillips (at Salina under Fort Riley). Fort Riley established 12 smaller branch camps, including Hutchinson.

On January 17, 2001,  of compressed natural gas leaked from the nearby Yaggy storage field. It sank underground, then rose to the surface through old brine or salt wells, making around 15 gas blowholes.

An explosion in the downtown area at 10:45 am destroyed two businesses and damaged 26 others. An explosion the next day in a mobile-home park killed two people. The Kansas National Guard was called in to help evacuate parts of the city because of the gas leaks, and a team of specialists looked over all the city for leaks after the event. These events were broadcast on nationally televised news stations across the country.

On June 21, 2013, following a grassroots campaign in an effort to promote Smallville Con, a comic-book convention hosted at the Kansas State Fair, the mayor of Hutchinson decreed the city's name would be changed to "Smallville" for one day in honor of Superman's fictional Kansas hometown of the same name. The tradition has continued every year coinciding with the convention for two days every June.

Geography
Hutchinson is located at  (38.0608445, -97.9297743) at an elevation of 1,535 feet (468 m).

The city lies on the northeast bank of the Arkansas River in the Great Bend Sand Prairie region of the Great Plains. Cow Creek, a tributary of the Arkansas, runs southeast through the city.

Climate
Hutchinson has a humid continental climate (Köppen Dfa) bordering on a humid subtropical climate (Köppen Cfa), with hot, humid summers and cold, dry winters. Temperatures exceed 90 °F (32 °C) an average of 63.4 days a year and drop below 32 °F (0 °C) an average of 119.5 days a year. On average, January is the coolest month, July is the warmest month, and May is the wettest month.

Demographics

2010 census
As of the 2010 United States Census, there were 42,080 people, 16,981 households, and 10,352 families residing in the city. The racial makeup of the city was 87.9% White, 4.3% African American, 0.7% American Indian, 0.6% Asian, 3.4% from other races, and 3.2% from two or more races. Hispanics and Latinos of any race were 10.6% of the population.

There were 16,981 households, of which 29.3% had children under the age of 18 living with them, 44.1% were married couples living together, 12.3% had a female householder with no husband present, 4.5% had a male householder with no wife present, and 39.0% were non-families. 33.2% of all households were made up of individuals, and 13.7% had someone living alone who was 65 years of age or older. The average household size was 2.31 and the average family size was 2.93.

The median age in the city was 37.8 years. 23.1% of residents were under the age of 18; 10.5% were between the ages of 18 and 24; 24.4% were from 25 to 44; 25.4% were from 45 to 64; and 16.6% were 65 years of age or older. The gender makeup of the city was 50.3% male and 49.7% female.

The median income for a household was $38,880, and the median income for a family was $47,336. Males had a median income of $39,442 versus $26,600 for females. The per capita income for the city was $21,050. About 12.9% of families and 15.7% of the population were below the poverty line, including 26.0% of those under age 18 and 6.9% of those age 65 or over.

2000 census
As of the census of 2000, there were 40,787 people, 16,335 households, and 10,340 families residing in the city. The racial makeup of the city was 88.57% White, 4.28% African American, 0.65% Native American, 0.59% Asian, 0.04% Pacific Islander, 3.65% from other races, and 2.21% from two or more races. Hispanic or Latino people of any race were 7.67% of the population.

There were 16,335 households, out of which 28.9% had children under the age of 18 living with them, 49.3% were married couples living together, 10.3% had a female householder with no husband present, and 36.7% were non-families. 31.7% of all households were made up of individuals, and 13.5% had someone living alone who was 65 years of age or older. The average household size was 2.31 and the average family size was 2.91.

In the city, the population was spread out, with 23.2% under the age of 18, 11.0% from 18 to 24, 27.8% from 25 to 44, 21.2% from 45 to 64, and 16.9% who were 65 years of age or older. The median age was 37 years. For every 100 females, there were 101.7 males. For every 100 females age 18 and over, there were 100.5 males.

As of 2000 the median income for a household in the city was $32,645, and the median income for a family was $40,094. Males had a median income of $30,994 versus $21,190 for females. The per capita income for the city was $17,964. About 9.8% of families and 12.7% of the population were below the poverty line, including 16.5% of those under age 18 and 9.7% of those age 65 or over.

Economy
Salt was discovered in Reno County by Benjamin Blanchard on September 26, 1887. This gave rise to the first salt-processing plants west of the Mississippi River. Salt was originally extracted using the evaporation method by pumping water into brine wells. In 1923, the Carey Salt Company opened the only salt mine in Hutchinson, which then produced rock salt. That mine is still in use today and is now operated by Hutchinson Salt Company. Cargill and Morton Salt also have evaporative salt plants in Hutchinson.

Excavated portions of the mine are used for archival storage of movie and television masters, data tapes, and permanent business records. Underground Vaults & Storage currently houses the masters for The Wizard of Oz (1939), Gone with the Wind (1939), and Star Wars (1977), among many others.

The world's longest grain elevator was built in Hutchinson in 1961.

Dillon's grocery stores was established in Hutchinson by J.S. Dillon in the 1920s (originated in Sterling, Kansas). Dillon's was bought out by The Kroger Co. in 1983. The company still operates a distribution center and headquarters for Dillons and Kwik Shop in town.

The Eaton Corporation operates a hydraulics plant in Hutchinson. On August 22, 2006, Eaton announced it would keep the Hutchinson plant open because of a $1 million economic incentive from the City of Hutchinson and a $2 million incentive from the State of Kansas. 155 assembly jobs were moved to the Reynosa, Mexico plant in June 2007.

On September 2, 2008, the Hutchinson Hospital changed its name to Promise Regional Medical Center. In 2012, it changed its name again to Hutchinson Regional Medical Center.

Lowen Corporation, founded in 1950 in a converted garage behind C.W. "Mike" Lowen's house, is a provider of graphic solutions. Lowen Sign Company, Lowen Color Graphics, and Lowen Certified are located in Hutchinson.

Collins Bus Corporation resides just outside Hutchinson, and is the leading small school bus manufacturer in North America.

In May 2009, Siemens announced it would open its American wind turbine nacelle assembly facility in Hutchinson. The facility was expected to begin producing in 2010 and to create 400 jobs in Hutchinson.

Kuhn-Krause operates a huge manufacturing plant in Hutchinson, manufacturing agricultural equipment and housing one of two Kuhn factories in North America.

Government
Hutchinson is a city of the first class with a council-manager form of government. The city council consists of five members. For purposes of representation in the council, the city is divided into four districts with one council member elected to a four-year term from each district. The fifth council member is elected at-large to a two-year term. Every year, the council selects one member to serve as mayor and another as vice-mayor. Council members are term limited and may not serve for more than one partial term plus two consecutive four-year terms. The council sets policy for the city and oversees the city manager who executes those policies. Hired by the council, the city manager serves as the city's chief administrative officer, administers the city budget, and conducts daily city business. Council meetings occur on the first and third Tuesday of each month, broadcast live on local cable channel 7.

As the county seat, Hutchinson is the administrative center of Reno County. The county courthouse is located downtown, and all departments of the county government base their operations in the city.

Hutchinson lies within Kansas's 1st U.S. Congressional District. For the purposes of representation in the Kansas Legislature, the city is located in the 34th district of the Kansas Senate and the 102nd, 104th, and 114th districts of the Kansas House of Representatives.

Education

Colleges
The main campus of Hutchinson Community College, a two-year public college, is located in the city.

Primary and secondary
Three public school districts provide education for students in and around Hutchinson: USD 308, USD 309. USD 313.

USD 308
Hutchinson USD 308 school district operates twelve schools in the city:
Avenue A Elementary School (grades Pre-K-6)
Faris Elementary School (K-6)
Graber Elementary School (K-6)
Lincoln Elementary School (K-6)
Magnet School at Allen (K-6)
McCandless Elementary School (K-6)
Morgan Elementary School (K-6)
Wiley Elementary School (K-6)
Hutchinson Middle School 7 (7)
Hutchinson Middle School 8 (8)
Hutchinson High School (9-12)
Hutchinson Career & Technical Educational Academy

The Hutchinson High School football team (the Salthawks) has had seven straight appearances, including six straight wins, in the 6A & 5A State Championship Game.

USD 313
Buhler USD 313 school district operates three schools in and around Hutchinson:
 Union Valley Elementary School (K-5)
 Plum Creek Elementary (K-5)
 Prairie Hills Middle School (6-8)

USD 309
Nickerson–South Hutchinson USD 309 school district operates one school near Hutchinson:
 Reno Valley Middle School (7-8).

Private
There are also three private schools in Hutchinson:
Central Christian School (K-12)
Holy Cross Catholic School (Pre-K-6)
Trinity Catholic High School (7-12)

Infrastructure

Transportation

U.S. Route 50 runs east–west south of the city. K-96 approaches Hutchinson from the south, bypasses it to the west, and then turns northwest. Coming from the west, K-61 runs concurrently with U.S. 50, turns north and runs through the eastern part of the city, and then exits to the northeast.

Reno County Area Transit (RCAT) provides local public transport bus service. The agency operates three bus routes colored Red, Blue, and Yellow. Greyhound Lines offers long-distance bus service on its route through Hutchinson from Wichita to Pueblo. Bus service is provided daily towards Wichita and Salina by BeeLine Express (subcontractor of Greyhound Lines).

Hutchinson Municipal Airport is located on the eastern side of the city. The airport is primarily utilized for general aviation. Therefore, residents typically use Wichita Dwight D. Eisenhower National Airport in Wichita for commercial travel.

Three railroads serve Hutchinson. One is the La Junta Subdivision of the BNSF Railway which runs east–west through the city. Amtrak uses the La Junta Subdivision to provide passenger rail service. Hutchinson is a stop on the Southwest Chief, which provides daily train service between Chicago and Los Angeles. Another railroad serving Hutchinson is the Tucumcari Line of the Union Pacific Railroad, which runs northeast–southwest through the city. Lastly, Hutchinson is the terminus of two lines of the Kansas and Oklahoma Railroad: the Hutchinson Subdivision, which enters the city from the south, and the Great Bend Subdivision, which enters the city from the northwest.

Health care
There are two hospitals in Hutchinson. The larger of the two, Hutchinson Regional Medical Center, is a not-for-profit general medical and surgical facility that offers a range of services including emergency care. The other hospital is Summit Surgical, a specialized corporate surgical facility.

Media

The Hutchinson News is the city's primary newspaper, published daily. Hutchinson Community College publishes a weekly student newspaper, the Collegian.

Hutchinson is a center of broadcast media for south-central Kansas. One AM and 12 FM radio stations are licensed to and/or broadcast from the city. Hutchinson is also the second principal city of the Wichita-Hutchinson, Kansas television market. The market's primary CBS, Dabl, and PBS affiliates are licensed to the city, but all three stations broadcast from Wichita.

Parks and recreation
Hutchinson is home to the Prairie Dunes Country Club, a golf course frequently ranked among the best golf courses in the U.S., and has hosted several United States Golf Association national championship tournaments. The club was founded by Emerson Carey and his four sons in the mid-1930s. The course was designed by Perry Maxwell and the first nine holes opened on September 13, 1937. Twenty years later in 1957 a second 9 holes were opened, designed by J. Press Maxwell (Perry's son). Prairie Dunes was host of the 2002 U.S. Women's Open and 2006 U.S. Senior Open golf championships.

Located on the north eastern edge of Hutchinson is the Sand Hills State Park.

Culture

Points of interest
 Kansas Cosmosphere and Space Center
 Strataca, formerly known as Kansas Underground Salt Museum
 Kansas State Fair
 Carey Park, home of the Hutchinson Zoo, Carey Park Golf Course, and Salt City Splash outdoor aquatic center

In popular culture and the arts

Film
 Wait till the Sun Shines, Nellie (1952), directed by Henry King, is set in Hutchinson.
 Picnic (1955), directed by Joshua Logan and winner of two Academy Awards, was partially shot in Hutchinson (grain elevator scene).
 Mysterious Skin (2004), directed by Gregg Araki and based on a 1996 Scott Heim book of the same name, is set in Hutchinson.
 Salvation U.S.A. (2013), directed by Brett Donowho and Bernie Van De Yacht, was shot in Hutchinson.

Television
 Dirty Jobs Season 2 Episode 42 was set in Hutchinson and focused on mining salt.
 Modern Marvels, Season 17 Episode 7 (time code: 29:40 - 34:26, first aired October 12, 2010), contained a segment on the Hutchinson Salt Mine.
 On Rocket Power, Samuel "Squid" Dullard is said to have moved from Hutchinson to Ocean Shores, California.
 In So Weirds Season 2, an episode takes place in Hutchinson where Molly is performing for a charity benefit.
 How Stuff Works "Salt Episode", mining salt.
 History Channel "Gas Explosion", 17 min segment on the Hutchinson Gas Explosion of 2001.
 "Situation Critical: Apollo 13" - this episode of the Situation Critical series was filmed at the Kansas Cosmosphere.

Literature
 Sprout, a 2009 novel by Dale Peck, is set in Hutchinson and surrounding areas.
 Mysterious Skin, a 1996 novel by Scott Heim (adapted into a film in 2004 starring Joseph Gordon-Levitt), is set in Hutchinson and nearby towns.

Sports
 Roller Derby - the Central Kansas Roller Girls - All Female Flat Track Roller Derby League formed in 2012. In 2016 it became a coed team and was renamed Central Kansas Roller Derby. In 2017 they added a junior team which has not yet been named.

Notable people

 Robert L. Burns (1876–1955), attorney; business manager of The Hutchinson News; Hutchinson school board, city council and school board for Los Angeles, California
 David Dillon (1951-), former CEO of Kroger, great-grandson of J.S. Dillon who founded Dillons

See also
 National Register of Historic Places listings in Reno County, Kansas
 Fox Theater
 Terminal Station
 St. Teresa's Catholic Church
 Arkansas Valley Interurban Railway
 Hutchinson Sports Arena

References

Further reading

External links

 
 
 Hutchinson - Directory of Public Officials
 , from Hatteberg's People on KAKE TV news
 Hutchinson city map, KDOT

 
Cities in Kansas
County seats in Kansas
Cities in Reno County, Kansas
Populated places established in 1872
Micropolitan areas of Kansas
Kansas populated places on the Arkansas River
1872 establishments in Kansas